Rocky Morton (born 1955) is an English director. He is the co-creator of the TV series Max Headroom and co-director of the 1993 Hollywood Pictures film Super Mario Bros. Various music videos by Tom Tom Club, Talking Heads, Gravity Kills, Orgy, George Harrison and Miles Davis are credited to Morton. He and his partner, Annabel Jankel, made their television debut with the original Max Headroom: 20 Minutes into the Future, and its Americanized version. The duo made their big-screen debut with D.O.A., starring Dennis Quaid and Meg Ryan.

References

External links
 

MJZ

1955 births
Living people
Date of birth missing (living people)
English film directors
English music video directors
English television directors
Advertising directors